The women's +75 kg competition of the weightlifting events at the 2015 Pan American Games in Toronto, Canada, was held on July 15 at the Oshawa Sports Centre. The defending champion was Oliba Nieve from Ecuador.

Schedule
All times are Eastern Daylight Time (UTC-4).

Results
6 athletes from five countries took part. A seventh weightlifter Astrid Camposeco of Guatemala was disqualified before competition, as she tested positive for doping on July 9.

References

External links
Weightlifting schedule

Weightlifting at the 2015 Pan American Games
Pan
Wei